Cleiton Ribeiro Xavier (born 23 March 1983) is a Brazilian former professional footballer who plays as an attacking midfielder. He is known by his powerful and accurate free kicks, dribbling skills and passes.

Club career
In his early career, Cleiton Xavier played for CSA and Internacional, and was loaned out various times.

Palmeiras
In early 2009, Palmeiras signed Cleiton from the relegated Figueirense. Cleiton Xavier proved he had good talent in Palmeiras's first matches in the Libertadores Cup and in the São Paulo State Championship. On 29 April 2009 Cleiton Xavier scored an 87th minute away-goal against Colo-Colo in the Libertadores Cup that secured Palmeiras' progression to the knockout stages of the tournament, it was a very long-range shot inside the goalkeeper's left angle.

Later in the Série A alongside teammate Diego Souza, Cleiton Xavier made an outstanding season with Palmeiras, leading the competition for 19 rounds, however Palmeiras finished 5th due to losses in the final matches and did not qualify for the Libertadores Cup. Cleiton Xavier was elected the 3rd best player of the season, even though he had an injury.
In 2010, Cleiton Xavier remained with Palmeiras and also started well the year. He participated in Palmeiras's first ten goals in the São Paulo State Championship.

Metalist Kharkiv
On 14 July 2010, Cleiton Xavier transferred to FC Metalist Kharkiv for €4.5 million. In 2013, he became popular for scoring a fastest equalizing goal from the starting line after the restart of the match against local league rival, Chornomorets. He then inspired them to a 3 – 1 victory which boosted their chances to qualify for next season Champions League campaign in which the victory lift them above another local rival who competing for the same spot, Dynamo Kyiv.

Club statistics

Honours
Internacional
Rio Grande do Sul State League: 2003, 2004

Figueirense
Santa Catarina State League: 2008

Palmeiras
Copa do Brasil: 2015
Campeonato Brasileiro: 2016

Vitória
 Campeonato Baiano: 2017

References

External links

 

figueirense.com 
 

1983 births
Living people
Brazilian footballers
Brazilian expatriate footballers
Expatriate footballers in Ukraine
Centro Sportivo Alagoano players
Sport Club Internacional players
Sport Club do Recife players
Brasiliense Futebol Clube players
Sociedade Esportiva do Gama players
Marília Atlético Clube players
Figueirense FC players
Sociedade Esportiva Palmeiras players
FC Metalist Kharkiv players
Esporte Clube Vitória players
Campeonato Brasileiro Série A players
Ukrainian Premier League players
Sportspeople from Alagoas
Brazilian expatriate sportspeople in Ukraine
Pan American Games medalists in football
Pan American Games silver medalists for Brazil
Association football midfielders
Footballers at the 2003 Pan American Games
Medalists at the 2003 Pan American Games